Philippine Science High School Cordillera Administrative Region Campus (PSHS-CARC) is one of the two campuses of the Philippine Science High School System established in 2009. The other one is Philippine Science High School Central Luzon Campus located in Clark, Pampanga. The PSHS-CARC was established through the congressional efforts of Baguio Representative Mauricio G. Domogan.

It formally opened classes on June 22, 2009 with 66 students from Baguio, Benguet, Mountain Province, Ifugao, Kalinga, Abra, Apayao, and Dagupan.

The school is being administered by Dr. Conrado C. Rotor, Jr. as the Campus Director.

The campus is located in Purok 12, Irisan, Baguio.

The pioneer batch graduated last March 28, 2013 at Baguio Country Club, having Gregory Eleazar Angeles has the highest honors among them.

Sections
Grade 7
-Diamond
-Jade
-Ruby

Grade 8
-Adelfa
-Camia
-Sampaguita

Grade 9
-Beryllium
-Lithium
-Helium

Grade 10
-Gluon
-Graviton
-Photon

Grades 11 and 12
-Blocks A to F

References

External links
PSHS Cordillera Administrative Region Campus official website

Philippine Science High School System
Schools in Baguio